In enzymology, a prostaglandin-D synthase is an enzyme that catalyzes the chemical reaction

(5Z,13E)-(15S)-9alpha,11alpha-epidioxy-15-hydroxyprosta-5,13- dienoate  (5Z,13E)-(15S)-9alpha,15-dihydroxy-11-oxoprosta-5,13-dienoate

Thus, the substrate of this enzyme is (5Z,13E)-(15S)-9alpha,11alpha-epidioxy-15-hydroxyprosta-5,13-dienoate, whereas its product is (5Z,13E)-(15S)-9alpha,15-dihydroxy-11-oxoprosta-5,13-dienoate.

This enzyme belongs to the family of isomerases, specifically a class of other intramolecular oxidoreductases. The systematic name of this enzyme class is (5,13)-(15S)-9alpha,11alpha-epidioxy-15-hydroxyprosta-5,13-dienoate Delta-isomerase. Other names in common use include prostaglandin-H2 Delta-isomerase, prostaglandin-R-prostaglandin D isomerase, and PGH-PGD isomerase. This enzyme participates in arachidonic acid metabolism.

In March 2012 American scientists reported a discovery that shows this enzyme triggers male baldness According to the discovery, levels of this enzyme are elevated in the cells of hair follicles located in bald patches on the scalp, but not in hairy areas. The research could lead to a cream to treat baldness.

Structural studies

See also
Prostaglandin D2 synthase

Hematopoietic prostaglandin D synthase

References

 
 

EC 5.3.99
Enzymes of known structure